Walter Ryan (17 June 1904 – 18 June 1989) was a Canadian cross-country skier. He competed in the men's 50 kilometre event at the 1932 Winter Olympics.

References

External links
 

1904 births
1989 deaths
Canadian male cross-country skiers
Olympic cross-country skiers of Canada
Cross-country skiers at the 1932 Winter Olympics
Place of birth missing